Stuart D. Goldman is an American historian and author. His most recent book is Nomonhan, 1939: The Red Army's Victory that Shaped World War II, about the little-known but highly consequential battle of Nomonhan/Khalkin Gol/, published by the US Naval Institute Press. He has also published numerous articles in World War II magazine.

Education 
Goldman got his BA in History from the City University of New York – Brooklyn College and then went to Colgate University for his MA. 
He received his PhD from Georgetown University during which he wrote a dissertation on The Forgotten War: the Soviet Union and Japan, 1937-1939.

More recently, Goldman spent a year at the National War College where he earned a Masters Degree in National Security Strategy.

Career 
Goldman taught History at Wilson College from 1969 to 1971 and Pennsylvania State University between 1971 and 1978. 
He then became a specialist in Russian and Eurasian political and military affairs at the Congressional Research Service of the Library of Congress, where he worked for 30 years. During that time, he wrote hundreds of analytical memoranda for Congressional Committees and Members and published scores of CRS reports.

Goldman has been a scholar in residence at the National Council for Eurasian and East European Research since his retirement from CRS in 2009.

Personal life 
He lives in Rockville, MD and Largo, FL.

References 

Living people
American military historians
Historians of World War II
Year of birth missing (living people)
Brooklyn College alumni